Hearts of the West is a 1925 American silent Western film directed and coproduced by Ward Lascelle,  written by Arthur Henry Gooden and starring Lester Cuneo and real life wife Francelia Billington. Cuneo also coproduced with Lascelle.

It is possibly a lost film.  A printed American Film Institute catalogue shows it held in the Library of Congress collection but the LOC online database shows no holdings.

Cast
 Lester Cuneo
 Francelia Billington
 Annabelle Lee
 Charles King
 Slim Padgett

References

External links
 Hearts of the West at IMDb.com
 

1925 films
1925 Western (genre) films
American black-and-white films
Arrow Film Corporation films
Silent American Western (genre) films
1920s American films
1920s English-language films